Acacia rupicola, commonly known as rock wattle, is a shrub belonging to the genus Acacia and the subgenus Phyllodineae native to south eastern Australia.

Description
It blooms between August and January with sporadic flowering at other times producing yellow flowers.

It is very similar in appearance to Acacia ulicifolia (Prickly Moses) but is easily distinguished by the sticky appearance of A. rupicola.

Distribution
It is endemic to a large area extending from the Eyre Peninsula in South Australia in the west thorough to Bordertown and to the Grampians in the Victoria in the east. It is found in rocky coastal areas in sandy to loamy soils often as a part of open scrub or woodland communities.

Cultivation
It can be grown form seed or cuttings.
The shrub is recommended as an understorey plant that can be grown in a second line from the coast, plains or foot-slopes which fares well in dry full sun or shady locations or rocky areas. It is often used in parks, reserves, highway verges, batters and wide median strips but requires well-drained soils. It is known to be both bird and insect attracting, tolerate drought and a moderate frost.

See also
 List of Acacia species

References

rupicola
Flora of Victoria (Australia)
Plants described in 1855
Taxa named by Ferdinand von Mueller